"Candidatus Bartonella durdenii" is a candidatus bacteria from the genus of Bartonella.

References

Bartonellaceae
Candidatus taxa